Chromium oxide may refer to:

 Chromium(II) oxide, CrO
 Chromium(III) oxide, Cr2O3
 Chromium dioxide (chromium(IV) oxide), CrO2, which includes the hypothetical compound chromium(II) chromate
 Chromium trioxide (chromium(VI) oxide), CrO3
 Chromium(VI) oxide peroxide, CrO5 
 Mixed valence species, such as Cr8O21

See also
 Chromate and dichromate
 CRO (disambiguation)

Chromium compounds
Transition metal oxides

ja:酸化クロム